Tin King is an at-grade MTR Light Rail stop located at the junction of Ming Kum Road and Tin King Road in Tuen Mun District, near Siu Pong Court in Tin King Estate. It began service on 24 September 1988 and belongs to Zone 3. It serves the Tin King Estate, Siu Pong Court and Po Tin Estate.

This stop is the terminus of Route , and has a balloon loop for trains on that line.

References

MTR Light Rail stops
Former Kowloon–Canton Railway stations
Tuen Mun District
Railway stations in Hong Kong opened in 1988
MTR Light Rail stops named from housing estates